Netley is a village in Hampshire, England.

Netley may also refer to:

Netley, South Australia, a suburb of Adelaide, South Australia
HMS Netley, several British Royal Navy ships

People with the surname
John Netley (1860–1903), English cab driver alleged to be involved with the Whitechapel Murders

People with the given name
Netley Lucas (c. 1903 – 1940), English confidence trickster and writer

See also
Netley Heath, an area near Gomshall in Surrey, England
Netley Marsh, a village and civil parish in Hampshire, England